Erastus B. Wolcott is a public art work by American artist Francis Herman Packer, located in Lake Park on the east side of Milwaukee, Wisconsin. The bronze equestrian commemorates military officer and physician Erastus B. Wolcott. It is located in the center of Lake Park, near Eight Stone Lions and the North Point Lighthouse.

It is said that his wife wrote the epitaph. The inscription reads:

References

1920 sculptures
Bronze sculptures in the United States
Culture of Milwaukee
Equestrian statues in Wisconsin
Outdoor sculptures in Milwaukee
Sculptures of men in Wisconsin